The following outline is provided as an overview of and topical guide to Tamil Nadu:

Tamil Nadu – state in South India. Tamil Nadu covers an area of 130,058 km2 (50,216 sq mi), and is the eleventh largest state in India. The bordering states are Kerala to the west, Karnataka to the north west and Andhra Pradesh to the north. To the east is the Bay of Bengal and the state encircles the union territory of Puducherry. The southernmost tip of the Indian Peninsula is Kanyakumari which is the meeting point of the Arabian Sea, the Bay of Bengal, and the Indian Ocean. When India became independent in 1947, Madras presidency became Madras state, comprising present-day Tamil Nadu, coastal Andhra Pradesh up to Ganjam district in Orissa, South Canara district Karnataka, and parts of Kerala. The state was subsequently split up along linguistic lines. In 1969, Madras State was renamed Tamil Nadu, meaning "Tamil country".

General reference

Names 
 Common name: Tamil Nadu
 Native name =  தமிழ்நாடு
 Pronunciation:  ; ; 
 Originally known as : Madras State Established in 1773; Madras State was formed in 1950 and renamed as Tamil Nadu on 14 January 1969
 Official name: Tamil Nadu
 Nicknames
 Adjectivals
 Tamil
 Demonyms
 Tamils
 Abbreviations and name codes
 ISO 3166-2 code:  IN-TN
 Vehicle registration code: TN

Rankings (amongst India's states) 

 by population: 6th
 by area (2011 census): 11th
 by crime rate (2015): 7th
 by gross domestic product (GDP) (2014): 2nd
by Human Development Index (HDI): 
by life expectancy at birth: 
by literacy rate:

Geography of Tamil Nadu 

Geography of Tamil Nadu
 Tamil Nadu is: an Indian state
 Population of Tamil Nadu: 
 Area of Tamil Nadu:  
 Atlas of Tamil Nadu

Location of Tamil Nadu 
 Tamil Nadu is situated within the following regions:
 Northern Hemisphere
 Eastern Hemisphere
 Eurasia
 Asia
 South Asia
 India
 South India
 Time zone:  Indian Standard Time (UTC+05:30)

Environment of Tamil Nadu 

 Climate of Tamil Nadu
 Protected areas of Tamil Nadu (see below)
 Wildlife of Tamil Nadu
 Flora of Tamil Nadu
 Fauna of Tamil Nadu
 Birds of Tamil Nadu

Natural geographic features of Tamil Nadu 

 Lakes of Tamil Nadu
 Mountains of Tamil Nadu
 Western Ghats
 Eastern Ghats
 Nilgiri mountains
 Rivers of Tamil Nadu

Protected areas of Tamil Nadu

Biosphere reserves 

Two of the three biosphere reserves in Tamil Nadu are among four in India and ninety five in Asia that are part of UNESCO's Programme on Man and the Biosphere (MAB).

The 3 Biosphere Reserves in Tamil Nadu listed by size are:
The Gulf of Mannar Biosphere Reserve
Nilgiri Biosphere Reserve
Agasthyamalai Biosphere Reserve

National parks 
<div>
This is the third lowest % area covered of all Indian states and Union territories.
Indira Gandhi National Park
Mudumalai National Park
Mukurthi National Park
Gulf of Mannar Marine National Park
Guindy National Park
Palani Hills National Park

Wildlife sanctuaries 

Grizzled Squirrel Wildlife Sanctuary
Indira Gandhi Wildlife Sanctuary
Kalakkad Wildlife Sanctuary
Mundanthurai Sanctuary
Kanyakumari Wildlife Sanctuary
Mudumalai Wildlife Sanctuary
Vallanadu Wildlife Sanctuary
Sathyamangalam Wildlife Sanctuary

Elephant reserves 
Tamil Nadu is a major participant in Project Elephant.
Nilgiri Elephant Reserve
Coimbatore Elephant Reserve
Anamalai Elephant Reserve
Srivilliputtur Elephant Reserve
Rejuvenation Camp for Temple and Private Elephants of Tamil Nadu

Tiger reserves 
Tamil Nadu has 4 tiger reserves which are declared as part of Project Tiger:
Kalakkad Mundanthurai Tiger Reserve
 Mudumalai National Park
Annamalai-Parambikulam Tiger Reserve
Sathyamangalam Wildlife Sanctuary
https://en.m.wikipedia.org/wiki/Sathyamangalam_Wildlife_Sanctuary
The state has 2 other significant tiger habitats:
Kanyakumari Wildlife Sanctuary
Mukurthi National Park

Bird sanctuaries 
There are 13 established bird sanctuaries at the southernmost continental range of the Central Asian Flyway in Tamil Nandu.
Chitrangudi Bird Sanctuary
Kanjirankulam Bird Sanctuary
Karaivetti Bird Sanctuary
Karikili Bird Sanctuary
Koothankulam Bird Sanctuary
Melaselvanur - Kilaselvanur Bird Sanctuary
Point Calimere Wildlife and Bird Sanctuary
Pulicat Lake Bird Sanctuary
Vaduvoor Bird Sanctuary
Vedanthangal Bird Sanctuary
Vellode Birds Sanctuary
Vettangudi Bird Sanctuary
Viralimalai Peacock Sanctuary
Kallaperambur lake 
Suchindram Theroor Birds Sanctuary

Regions of Tamil Nadu

Ecoregions of Tamil Nadu 

Ecoregions in Tamil Nadu

Administrative divisions of Tamil Nadu 

Administrative divisions of Tamil Nadu
 Districts of Tamil Nadu
 Municipalities of Tamil Nadu

Districts of Tamil Nadu 

 Districts of Tamil Nadu

Municipalities of Tamil Nadu 

Municipalities of Tamil Nadu

 Capital of Tamil Nadu: Capital of Tamil Nadu
 Cities of Tamil Nadu

Demography of Tamil Nadu 

Demographics of Tamil Nadu

Government and politics of Tamil Nadu 

Politics of Tamil Nadu

 Form of government: Indian state government (parliamentary system of representative democracy)
 Capital of Tamil Nadu: Capital of Tamil Nadu
 Elections in Tamil Nadu
 (specific elections)

Union government in Tamil Nadu 
 Rajya Sabha members from Tamil Nadu
 Tamil Nadu Pradesh Congress Committee
 Indian general election, 2009 (Tamil Nadu)
 Indian general election, 2014 (Tamil Nadu)

Branches of the government of Tamil Nadu 

Government of Tamil Nadu

Executive branch of the government of Tamil Nadu 

 Head of state: Governor of Tamil Nadu
 Head of government: Chief Minister of Tamil Nadu
Council of Ministers of Tamil Nadu

Legislative branch of the government of Tamil Nadu 

Tamil Nadu Legislative Assembly
 Constituencies of Tamil Nadu Legislative Assembly

Judicial branch of the government of Tamil Nadu 

Madras High Court
Chief Justice of Madras High Court

Law and order in Tamil Nadu 

 Law enforcement in Tamil Nadu
 Tamil Nadu Police

History of Tamil Nadu 

History of Tamil Nadu

History of Tamil Nadu, by period

Prehistoric Tamil Nadu

Ancient Tamil Nadu

Medieval Tamil Nadu

Colonial Tamil Nadu

Contemporary Tamil Nadu

History of Tamil Nadu, by region

History of Tamil Nadu, by subject

Culture of Tamil Nadu 

Culture of Tamil Nadu
 Architecture of Tamil Nadu
 Temples of Tamil Nadu
 Cuisine of Tamil Nadu
 Languages of Tamil Nadu
 Monuments in Tamil Nadu
 Monuments of National Importance in Tamil Nadu
 State Protected Monuments in Tamil Nadu
 World Heritage Sites in Tamil Nadu

Art in Tamil Nadu 
 Cinema of Tamil Nadu
 Karakattam
 Nadaswaram
 Melam
 
 ōyilāttam
 Bharatanatyam
 Devadasis
 Terukkuttu
 Kattaikkuttu

Literature of Tamil Nadu 

Tamil literature
 Tirukkural
 Tamil Sangams
 Tiruvalluvar
 Paripaatal
 Subramanya Bharathy
 Bharathidasan
 Jallikattu

Music of Tamil Nadu 

Music of Tamil Nadu
 Thevaram
 Carnatic music
 
 
 Ballads
 Tyagaraja
 Muthuswami Dikshitar
 Syama Sastri
 Thiruvaiyaru
 Tamil Trinity
 Muthu Thandavar
 Arunachala Kavi
 Marimutthu Pillai
 Madras Music Season

Festivals in Tamil Nadu 

 Pongal
 Tamil New Year
 Dasara
 Vinayaka Chathurthi
 Eid ul-Fitr
 Easter

People of Tamil Nadu 

People of Tamil Nadu
 People from Tamil Nadu

Religion in Tamil Nadu 

Religion in Tamil Nadu
 Christianity in Tamil Nadu
 Hinduism in Tamil Nadu
 Temples of Tamil Nadu

Sports in Tamil Nadu 

Sports in Tamil Nadu
 Cricket in Tamil Nadu
 Tamil Nadu Cricket Association
 Tamil Nadu cricket team
 Football in Tamil Nadu
 Tamil Nadu football team

Symbols of Tamil Nadu 

Symbols of Tamil Nadu
 Animal: Nilgiri Tahr
 Bird: Emerald Dove
 Dance: Bharatanatyam
 Fish:
 Flower: Gloriosa Lily
 Motto: 
 Seal of Tamil Nadu
 Song: "Invocation to Tamil Mother"
 Sport: Sadugudu
 Tree: Palm Tree

Economy and infrastructure of Tamil Nadu 

Economy of Tamil Nadu
 Tourism in Tamil Nadu
 Transport in Tamil Nadu
 Airports in Tamil Nadu

Education in Tamil Nadu 

Education in Tamil Nadu
 Institutions of higher education in Tamil Nadu
 Schools of Equality

Health in Tamil Nadu 

Health in Tamil Nadu

See also 

 Outline of India

References

External links 

 
 Tamil Nadu Government Website

Tamil Nadu
Tamil Nadu
 1